A Lagerstätte (from Lager 'storage, lair' Stätte 'place'; plural Lagerstätten) is a sedimentary deposit that exhibits extraordinary fossils with exceptional preservation—sometimes including preserved soft tissues. These formations may have resulted from carcass burial in an anoxic environment with minimal bacteria, thus delaying the decomposition of both gross and fine biological features until long after a durable impression was created in the surrounding matrix. Lagerstätten span geological time from the Neoproterozoic era to the present. Worldwide, some of the best examples of near-perfect fossilization are the Cambrian Maotianshan shales and Burgess Shale, the Silurian Waukesha Biota, the Devonian Hunsrück Slates and Gogo Formation, the Carboniferous Mazon Creek, the Jurassic Posidonia Shale and Solnhofen Limestone, the Cretaceous Yixian, Santana, and Agua Nueva formations, the Eocene Green River Formation, the Miocene Foulden Maar and Ashfall Fossil Beds, the Pliocene Gray Fossil Site, the Pleistocene Naracoorte Caves, the La Brea Tar Pits, and the Tanis Fossil Site.

Types
Palaeontologists distinguish two kinds:
 Konzentrat-Lagerstätten (concentration Lagerstätten) are deposits with a particular "concentration" of disarticulated organic hard parts, such as a bone bed. These Lagerstätten are less spectacular than the more famous Konservat-Lagerstätten. Their contents invariably display a large degree of time averaging, as the accumulation of bones in the absence of other sediment takes some time. Deposits with a high concentration of fossils that represent an in situ community, such as reefs or oyster beds, are not considered Lagerstätten.
 Konservat-Lagerstätten (conservation Lagerstätten) are deposits known for the exceptional preservation of fossilized organisms or traces. The individual taphonomy of the fossils varies with the sites. Conservation Lagerstätten are crucial in elucidating important moments in the history and evolution of life. For example, the Burgess Shale of British Columbia is associated with the Cambrian explosion, and the Solnhofen limestone with the earliest known bird, Archaeopteryx.

Preservation

Konservat-Lagerstätten preserve lightly sclerotized and soft-bodied organisms or traces of organisms that are not otherwise preserved in the usual shelly and bony fossil record; thus, they offer more complete records of ancient biodiversity and behavior and enable some reconstruction of the palaeoecology of ancient aquatic communities. In 1986, Simon Conway Morris calculated only about 14% of genera in the Burgess Shale had possessed biomineralized tissues in life. The affinities of the shelly elements of conodonts were mysterious until the associated soft tissues were discovered near Edinburgh, Scotland, in the Granton Lower Oil Shale of the Carboniferous. Information from the broader range of organisms found in Lagerstätten have contributed to recent phylogenetic reconstructions of some major metazoan groups.  Lagerstätten seem to be temporally autocorrelated, perhaps because global environmental factors such as climate might affect their deposition.

A number of taphonomic pathways may produce Lagerstätten.  The following is an incomplete list:
 Orsten-type and Doushantuo-type preservations preserve organisms in phosphate.
 Bitter Springs-type preservation preserves them in silica.
 Carbonaceous films are the result of Burgess Shale-type preservation
 Pyrite preserves exquisite detail in Beecher's trilobite-type preservation.
 Ediacaran-type preservation preserves casts and moulds with the aid of microbial mats.

Important Konservat-Lagerstätten

The world's major Lagerstätten include:

Precambrian

Cambrian

Ordovician

Silurian

Devonian

Carboniferous

Permian

Triassic

Jurassic

Cretaceous

Eocene

Oligocene–Miocene

Miocene

Pliocene

Quaternary

See also
 List of fossil sites (with link directory)
 Hoard, a concentration of human artifacts useful for similar reasons in archaeology

References

Further reading
 Penney, D. (ed.) 2010. Biodiversity of Fossils in Amber from the Major World Deposits. Siri Scienfic Press, Manchester, 304 pp.
  – A catalogue of sites of exceptional fossil preservation produced by MSc palaeobiology students at University of Bristol's Department of Earth Sciences.
 

 
German words and phrases